Tippett is a surname. Notable people with the surname include:

Andre Tippett (born 1959), American Hall of Fame footballer
Clark Tippet (1954–1992), American dancer
Dave Tippett (born 1961), ice hockey coach 
Keith Tippett (born 1947), English pianist known for work with King Crimson
Krista Tippett (born 1960), journalist, author, public intellectual, and entrepreneur
Kurt Tippett (born 1987), Australian rules footballer
James Sterling Tippett (1885-1958), American educator
L. H. C. Tippett (1902-1985), English statistician
Liz Whitney Tippett (1906-1988), American philanthropist
Michael Tippett (1905-1998), English composer
Owen Tippett (born 1999), Canadian ice hockey player.
Peter Tippett (born 1953), American physician, researcher, and inventor
Peter Tippett (footballer) (1926–1990), Australian rules footballer
Phil Tippett (born 1951), animator, visual effects supervisor and founder of Tippett Studio

Fictional characters
Gerald Tippett, a character in Shortland Street

See also
4081 Tippett, an asteroid
Tippett Studio, a visual effects company